Moked (lit. "Focus") was a left-wing political party in Israel.

Background
Moked came into existence during the seventh Knesset, when Maki (which had one seat, held by Shmuel Mikunis) merged with the Blue-Red Movement, which was unrepresented.

The new party ran in the 1973 elections, but won only 1.4% of the vote and one seat, which was taken by Meir Pa'il. During the Knesset session the party changed its name to Moked - for Peace and Socialist Change.

Prior to the 1977 elections the party split in two. Some of the Maki faction merged into Hadash alongside Rakah, which had split from it in 1965, whilst the non-Communist members joined the Left Camp of Israel. The new party won two seats, with Pa'il taking one in rotation.

External links
Moked Knesset website
Moked documents at the Israeli Left Archive

Political parties established in 1973
Political parties disestablished in 1977
Defunct political parties in Israel
Far-left politics in Israel
Socialist parties in Israel
Far-left political parties
1973 establishments in Israel
1977 disestablishments in Israel